Cleistocactus samaipatanus is a species of flowering plant in the family Cactaceae, native to Bolivia. It grows vigorously with large, pinky-red flowers in summer.

In cultivation in the UK, this plant has gained the Royal Horticultural Society’s Award of Garden Merit (confirmed 2017). 
However, as it does not tolerate temperatures below , it must be grown under glass, though it may be placed outside during the warm summer months.

Gallery

References

Trichocereeae
Cacti of South America
Flora of Argentina
Flora of Bolivia
Flora of Peru
Flora of Uruguay